The rectouterine pouch (recto-uterine pouch), pouch of Douglas, or rectovaginal pouch is the extension of the peritoneum between the rectum and the posterior wall of the uterus in the human female. Its anterior boundary is formed by the posterior fornix of the vagina.

Structure
In women, the rectouterine pouch is the deepest point of the peritoneal cavity. It lies posterior to the uterus and anterior to the rectum. (The pouch on the other side of the uterus is the vesicouterine pouch.) It is near the posterior fornix of the vagina.

It is normal to have approximately 1 to 3 ml (or mL) of fluid in the rectouterine pouch throughout the menstrual cycle. After ovulation there is between 4 and 5 ml of fluid in the rectouterine pouch.

In men, the region corresponding to the rectouterine pouch is the rectovesical pouch, which lies between the urinary bladder and rectum.

Clinical significance
The rectouterine pouch, being the lowest part of the peritoneal cavity in a woman at supine position, is a common site for the spread of pathology such as ascites, tumour, endometriosis, pus, etc.

As it is the furthest point of the abdominopelvic cavity in women, it is a site where infection and fluids typically collect.

The rectouterine pouch can be used in the treatment of end-stage kidney failure in patients who are treated by peritoneal dialysis. The tip of the dialysis catheter is placed into the deepest point of the pouch.

Culdocentesis
Culdocentesis is a procedure that draws fluid from the pouch, by way of the vagina using a needle. Fluid drawn using a scalpel incision is called a colpotomy.

Naming and etymology
The rectouterine (or recto-uterine) pouch is also called the rectouterine excavation, uterorectal pouch, rectovaginal pouch, pouch of Douglas (after anatomist James Douglas, 1675–1742), Douglas pouch, Douglas cavity, Douglas space, Douglas cul-de-sac, Ehrhardt–Cole recess, Ehrhardt–Cole cul-de-sac, cavum Douglasi, or excavatio rectouterina. The combining forms reflect the rectum (recto-, -rectal) and uterus (utero-, -uterine).

In Obstetrics and gynaecology, it is commonly referred to as the pouch of Douglas or the posterior cul-de-sac.

The Douglas fold (rectouterine plica), Douglas line, and Douglas septum are likewise named after the same James Douglas.

In popular culture
The Pouch of Douglas was  featured in the Netflix special Hannah Gadsby: Douglas to deconstruct patriarchy.

In Ghost World the Trivia Question at the Cafe where Scarlett Johansson's character works is "where in the human body is the Douglas Pouch located?"

Additional images

See also 
Dolichodouglas
 Vesicouterine pouch
 Rectovesical pouch

References

Further reading

External links
  - "The Female Pelvis: Distribution of the Peritoneum in the Female Pelvis"
 
 
 
 
 
 

Pelvis